Natural Blitz (2000 - May 12, 2008), originally named Shout From Maroof, was an Australian-bred stallion that competed in Australia, Macau, and Hong Kong. Owned by Danny Lam Yin-kee, its trainers included Danny Shum, Derek Cruz and others. 

Natural Blitz initially competed in Perth, Australia, where it was named Shout From Maroof. Under the tutelage of three different trainers, Natural Blitz won eight of its nine starts in Macau - the first eight in a row.

Natural Blitz died on May 12, 2008. It has been deregistered at the Hong Kong Jockey Club.

See also
Good Ba Ba

References

2000 racehorse births
2008 racehorse deaths
Racehorses bred in Australia
Racehorses trained in Australia
Racehorses trained in Hong Kong